Benjamin Isadore Schwartz (December 12, 1916 – November 14, 1999) was an American academic, political scientist, and sinologist who wrote on a wide range of topics in Chinese politics and intellectual history.

He taught at Harvard his entire career, starting in 1950 as an instructor in the departments of history and government. He held the Leroy B. Williams Chair in History and Government from 1975 until he retired in 1987. He was president of the Association for Asian Studies in 1979.

Educational background
Schwartz was born in East Boston and grew up in a poor family, but graduated from Boston Latin, a school known as a gateway to higher education. He attended Harvard College as a day student on scholarship at a time when poor or Jewish students found the atmosphere unwelcoming. He graduated from Harvard in 1938 with a degree in modern languages, with the honors thesis Pascal and the XVIIIth Century "Philosophes". He started a career in school teaching before studying Japanese in the United States Army during the Second World War and working on code-breaking. After the war he earned an M.A. in East Asian studies at Harvard and went on to gain a Ph.D. there, studying under John King Fairbank.

Career
Schwartz was a member of the Harvard faculty, teaching in Cambridge until he retired in 1987.

In 1983–1984, Schwartz served as acting director of the Fairbank Center for Chinese Studies.

A festschrift in his honour was held after his retirement, and published  in 1990 as Ideas across cultures: essays on Chinese thought in honor of Benjamin I. Schwartz and published by the  Harvard University Asia Center.

Scholarly work and contributions
Schwartz's early works studied the relations between political thought and action. His first book was Chinese communism and the rise of Mao published by Harvard's Russian Research Center in 1951.  The Introduction says he will investigate the movement's “ideas, intentions, and ambitions” over a "limited period,” from 1918 to 1933, and only “in terms of its doctrinal frame of reference and of its internal political relations,” not “the ‘objective’ social and political conditions which have encouraged its growth or in terms of its effect on the masses.”  The Communists came to power “on the crest of a popular movement” but this did not mean that they were the “mystic embodiment of the popular will.” Future decisions “will be made by the political leaders and not by the surging masses.”  To say that leaders would automatically continue to express the needs and aspirations of the masses would be to “construct a myth designed to sanction in advance all their future activities.” 

His second monograph, In Search of Wealth and Power, turned to the relations between tradition, modernity, and identity seen in the work of Yan Fu (1854-1921), best known as the translator and interpreter of John Stuart Mill, Charles Darwin, and Herbert Spencer. Earlier scholars had not thought Yan of interest, assuming that he had simply misunderstood these influential thinkers and their late 19th-century liberalism and individualism. But Schwartz used the choices that Yan Fu made in his translations to reflect on the ways in which the pursuit of wealth and power in the West had subverted individual values, even within its own liberal tradition. In 1968 he published a collection of essays following developments of the 1950s and 1960s: Communism and China; ideology in flux (Harvard University Press).

He edited the symposium Reflections on the May Fourth movement: a symposium.  (East Asian Research Center, Harvard University; distributed by Harvard University Press, 1972). China and Other Matters (Cambridge, Massachusetts: Harvard University Press ) collected essays from later years.

He also wrote on earlier periods. It was reviewed in The American Historical Review, Bulletin of the School of Oriental and African Studies, Harvard Journal of Asiatic Studies, China Quarterly, The Journal of Asian Studies, Philosophy East and West,  Chinese Literature: Essays, Articles, Reviews, and The Australian Journal of Chinese Affairs.

Selected works
 
 ; Harvard University Press, 2009, 
 Communism and China: Ideology in Flux (Cambridge, Massachusetts: Harvard University Press, 1968).
 ; Harvard University Press, 2009, 
 The secret speeches of Chairman Mao : from the hundred flowers to the great leap forward by Zedong Mao (1989)
 Reflections on the May Fourth movement: a symposium, East Asian Research Center, Harvard University, 1972.
 China's Cultural Values, Center for Asian Studies, Arizona State University, 1985

Notes

References and further reading
 
 
 Schwartz, Benjamin; Paul A Cohen and Merle Goldman. (1990). Ideas across cultures : essays on Chinese thought in honor of Benjamin I. Schwartz. Cambridge: Harvard University Press. ;  OCLC 21227823
 Suleski, Ronald Stanley. (2005). The Fairbank Center for East Asian Research at Harvard University: a Fifty Year History, 1955–2005. Cambridge: Harvard University Press. ;  OCLC 64140358

1916 births
1999 deaths
American sinologists
Harvard University alumni
Presidents of the Association for Asian Studies
Boston Latin School alumni